Morten Schønfeldt  (born 18 November 1967) is a Norwegian handball player.

He played for the clubs Bækkelagets SK, SK Wing, Sandefjord HK, Fredensborg/Ski and Pfadi Winterthur. He made his debut on the Norwegian national team in 1988, 
and played 119 matches for the national team between 1988 and 1994. He participated at the 1993 World Men's Handball Championship.

He is a son of Norway international handballer Erik Schønfeldt.

Morten Schønfeldt also coached Nordstrand IF's women's team among others.

References

1967 births
Living people
Handball players from Oslo
Norwegian male handball players
Norwegian handball coaches
Expatriate handball players
Norwegian expatriate sportspeople in Switzerland